Matt Campbell (born 17 February 1995) is an Australian racing car driver, specialising in sports car racing. He is a Porsche factory driver, having formerly been a junior then young professional. He is one of three factory drivers whose driver categorisation is gold alongside Sven Müller and Mathieu Jaminet. Campbell is the reigning champion of the 2022 IMSA SportsCar Championship in the GTD Pro class (with Jaminet) and is now a full-time driver of the #7 Porsche 963 for Porsche Penske Motorsport. Campbell won the 2016 Porsche Carrera Cup Australia driving for McElrea Racing. Campbell moved to Germany in 2017 and was third in the 2017 Porsche Supercup. Campbell is currently driving for Dempsey-Proton Racing in the FIA World Endurance Championship in the LMGTE Am class driving a Porsche 911 RSR. He has taken three victories including at the 2018 24 Hours of Le Mans. Campbell also won the 2019 Bathurst 12 Hour driving a Porsche 911 GT3 R for Earl Bamber Motorsport.

Racing career

Early career 

When Campbell was 14, he got a Datsun 1200 coupe, he raced with that with the support of his mother. Campbell's grandfather Bill and aunt Teresa are both racing drivers, Bill managed Morgan Park Raceway in the family's home town of Warwick for many years until his death in 2015. Matt then got some driver coaching and entered the Queensland and Australian Formula Ford Series racing with Synergy Motorsport in the national series.

GT Racing 

In 2014, Campbell competed in the Porsche GT3 Cup Challenge Australia dominating the B class championship. He moved up to the Porsche Carrera Cup Australia Championship in 2015, finishing third in the series, and then won the 2016 series.

In 2017, Campbell relocated to Germany and he drove for Fach Auto Tech in the Porsche Supercup, finishing third overall. This led to a drive for Dempsey-Proton Racing in the LMGTE Am class of the 2018–19 FIA World Endurance Championship. He won the class at the second round of the series, the 2018 24 Hours of Le Mans, driving with Christian Ried and Julien Andlauer. The same driver combination also took victory in the third round, the 2018 6 Hours of Silverstone. Campbell and Andlauer would finish second in the LMGTE Am championship after receiving a points penalty for a software issue that ultimately denied them a championship victory despite winning five of the eight rounds.
The 2019-20 season with Dempsey-Proton was disappointing ending eighth in the championship. Campbell also raced in GT3 around the world, for Rowe Racing in the 2019 Blancpain GT Series Endurance Cup in Europe and for Wright Motorsports in the 2019 Blancpain GT World Challenge America making top five finishes in both series. The season highlight was his charge through the field in the final hour to win the 2019 Bathurst 12 Hour with Earl Bamber Motorsport. In 2020, outside of his Dempsey-Proton duties, Campbell was runner up in the Intercontinental GT Challenge racing with Mathieu Jaminet and Patrick Pilet, racing with the Absolute Racing and GPX Racing teams. He also raced with star Belgian GT3 team Manthey Racing in the Nürburgring Langstrecken Serie and with CORE Autosport in the IMSA Sportscar Championship.
2021 saw Campbell link with Proton Competition's American campaign in the IMSA Sportscar Championship as a co-driver with Cooper MacNeil in the GTLM class, placing fourth in the series sharing victories three times. In the World Endurance Chamoionship, Dempsey-Proton was the best of the Porsche teams in LMGTE Am and finished third in the championship with Christian Ried and Jaxon Evans after a pair of second places at the final two rounds. Another highlight was a come-from-behind victory in the 2021 Paul Ricard 1000km with GPX Racing.
Campbell and Jaminet dominated the 2022 IMSA Sportscar Championship in the GTD Pro class with Pfaff Motorsports winning five of the ten races.

Supercars 

Campbell made his Supercars debut for Nissan Motorsport in 2016, co-driving with Todd Kelly in the Pirtek Enduro Cup. In 2017, Campbell joined defending champion Shane van Gisbergen at Triple Eight Race Engineering and took fifth place at Bathurst, to date his best finish in the Bathurst 1000.

Racing record

Career summary

† As Campbell was a guest driver, he was ineligible to score points.
* Season still in progress.

Complete Bathurst 12 Hour results

Supercars Championship results

Bathurst 1000 results

Complete Porsche Supercup results
(key) (Races in bold indicate pole position) (Races in italics indicate fastest lap)

Complete FIA World Endurance Championship results
(key) (Races in bold indicate pole position; races in italics indicate fastest lap)

Notes
 – All points earned by the team prior to the Shanghai round were nullified.

Complete 24 Hours of Le Mans results

24 Hours of Dubai results

24 Hours of Daytona results

Complete IMSA SportsCar Championship results
(key) (Races in bold indicate pole position; races in italics indicate fastest lap)

* Season still in progress.

Complete European Le Mans Series results
(key) (Races in bold indicate pole position; results in italics indicate fastest lap)

References

External links

 
 Matt Campbell profile on US Racing Reference

Australian racing drivers
Living people
Supercars Championship drivers
1995 births
FIA World Endurance Championship drivers
24 Hours of Daytona drivers
24 Hours of Le Mans drivers
24H Series drivers
GT World Challenge America drivers
People from Warwick, Queensland
Porsche Motorsports drivers
ADAC GT Masters drivers
WeatherTech SportsCar Championship drivers
European Le Mans Series drivers
Porsche Supercup drivers
Blancpain Endurance Series drivers
Rowe Racing drivers
ART Grand Prix drivers
Nismo drivers
Kelly Racing drivers
FIA Motorsport Games drivers
Nürburgring 24 Hours drivers
McLaren Racing drivers
Toksport WRT drivers
Team Penske drivers
Porsche Carrera Cup Germany drivers